State Road 532 (NM 532) is a  state highway in the US state of New Mexico. NM 532's western terminus is at the end of route at Sierra Blanca Ski Recreation Area, and the eastern terminus is at NM 48 north of Ruidoso.

Major intersections

See also

References

532
Transportation in Lincoln County, New Mexico